Invincible is the name of several ships
 , several ships of the name
 , several ships of the name
 , several ships of the name
 , part of the Revolutionary Texas Navy (1836–1837)
 , used as a transport by the US Army from 1849 to 1851

See also
 Invincible class, several ship classes of the name

Ship names